The Lycoming O-233 is a four-cylinder, air-cooled, horizontally opposed piston aircraft engine that was built by Lycoming Engines between 1940 and 1944.

Development
Lycoming applied for certification of the O-233 on 13 June 1940, with certification to CAR 13 (amended to 31 May 1938) granted on 16 August 1940. The O-233 had its type certificate cancelled on 25 February 1944 at serial number 106.

The FAA type certificate notes:

Variants
O-233-A1
Sole variant, type certification cancelled 25 February 1944

Specifications (O-233-A1)

See also

References

External links

 Textron Lycoming - Manufacturer's home page

Boxer engines
O-233
1940s aircraft piston engines